Lost at Christmas is a 2020 British romantic comedy film. It is written and directed by Ryan Hendrick and stars Kenny Boyle, Natalie Clark, Sylvester McCoy, Sanjeev Kohli, Clare Grogan and Frazer Hines.

Plot
Two strangers stranded in the Scottish Highlands on Christmas Eve team up to try and get home in time for Christmas.

Cast
 Kenny Boyle as Rob
 Natalie Clark as Jen
 Sylvester McCoy as Ernie
 Sanjeev Kohli as Sid
 Clare Grogan as Anna
 Frazer Hines as Frank
 Caitlin Blackwood as Clara
 Karen Bartke as Ellen
 Alasdair McCrone as James
 Alexander Teunion as Chris
 Nicolette McKeown as Nicki
 Simon Laidlaw as the taxi driver

Production
Originally titled Perfect Strangers, the film is based on Ryan Hendrick's 2015 short film of the same name. Production on Lost at Christmas began in September 2019. In June 2020, the film entered its final stages of production, ready for its release at Christmas 2020. The film also appeared in a special BBC News report in January 2020 while filming was taking place, including interviews with members of the cast and production crew. The film was renamed from Perfect Strangers to Lost at Christmas during post-production in October 2020.

Casting
The full cast list was revealed on 20 November 2019, that consisted of Kenny Boyle, Natalie Clark, Sylvester McCoy, Sanjeev Kohli, Clare Grogan, Frazer Hines, Caitlin Blackwood, Karen Bartke, Alasdair McCrone, Alexander Teunion and Nicolette McKeown with additional cast members being announced on 28 December.

Filming
Filming took place January 2020 around Fort William and Glencoe and was completed in twelve days. Filming was officially completed on 19 January 2020.

Release
The film had its premiere on 26 November 2020 at the Highland Cinema in Fort William. It was released in cinemas on 4 December 2020 and via the internet on 7 December 2020.

Reception
Writing in The Guardian, Leslie Felperin gave the film two stars, describing it as a "dully sentimental, unfunny romantic comedy".

BrumNotes Magazine said of the film, "Here’s some lovely interplay and chemistry between the cast that delivers some genuine tenderness and poignancy and with an ending that turns out to not be so predictable after all."

See also
 List of Christmas films

References

External links

2020 films
2020s English-language films
British romantic comedy-drama films
2020s Christmas comedy-drama films
2020 romantic comedy-drama films
2020s British films